The Attorney General of Hawaii is the chief legal officer and chief law enforcement officer of Hawaii. In present-day statehood within the United States, the Attorney General is appointed by the elected governor with the approval of the state senate and is responsible for a state department charged with advising the various other departments and agencies of state government.  The Attorney General is responsible for the prosecution of offenses under state law. The Attorney General can only be removed by an act of the state senate. In rare occasions, the Attorney General serves as acting governor in the absence of both the governor and lieutenant governor from the state for an extended period of time.

The office has existed in several forms throughout the history of the Hawaiian Islands. It was created by Kamehameha III and was part of the administration of each successive monarch of the Kingdom of Hawaii. The office was kept in the provisional government, after Liliuokalani and the monarchy was overthrown, and became a part of the succeeding administration of the Republic of Hawaii. A regular part of the American model of the executive branch of government, the office of attorney general was part of the Territory of Hawaii under Section 80 of the Hawaiian Organic Act and made an appointed office after statehood was achieved in 1959.

Though a non-partisan office, in territorial days the office of Attorney General was traditionally appointed from the political party of the sitting President of the United States who appointed the territorial governor. Similarly in statehood, the office of Attorney General has traditionally been appointed from the incumbent governor's political party, thus far Republican or Democratic.

The current Attorney General is Anne E. Lopez, who was appointed by Governor Josh Green on December 8, 2021. The Hawaii Senate confirmed Lopez's nomination on December 5, 2022.

Agencies
The Attorney General leads a department of 180 attorneys and 500 professional and support personnel. The department oversees various public services. These include administering the Hawaii Criminal Justice Data Center, running the Missing Child Center, Child Support Enforcement Agency, Hawaii Internet Crimes Against Children Task Force, Hawaii Internet and Technology Crimes Unit, Office of Child Support Hearings, Tobacco Enforcement Unit, among others. In accordance with Chapter 846E of the Hawaii Revised Statutes, the Criminal Justice Data Center maintains a registry of sex offenders in the state. Likewise, the agency provides other criminal history information through the statewide criminal history record information system and Automated Fingerprint Identification System.

History

Origins

John Ricord served as the first Attorney General of Hawaii. He arrived in the Kingdom on February 27, 1844, on the Columbia. He was the first Western-trained lawyer in the islands. 
The previous year a land dispute by Richard Charlton led to a British occupation known as the Paulet Affair. A related case of Ladd & Co. required lengthy arbitration. These cases would consume his entire time on the islands. Within a few weeks he swore allegiance to Kamehameha III and on March 9, 1844, was appointed first Attorney General. In July 1845 he joined the Privy Council.
On October 29, 1845, the executive branch of the government was formally organized through legislation he proposed. On May 17, 1847, he resigned all his offices, and on June 12 was released from his oath of allegiance, so he could resume his citizenship of the United States.
He left August 19, 1847.
The office of Attorney General was suspended until the 1860s.
His work on organizing the courts was taken over by the second trained attorney to arrive in the islands, William Little Lee.

Revival
On August 26, 1862, Kamehameha IV revived the office and appointed Charles Coffin Harris as Attorney General. Having an attorney general proved useful on constitutional matters. Kamehameha V insisted on a new constitution that would restore some of the power to the monarchy that had been lost over time. Harris issued his legal opinion that the king had such a right and produced an early draft. A constitutional convention failed to reach agreement, so Harris got the cabinet to negotiate directly with Kamehameha V leading to the promulgation of the 1864 Constitution.

Controversies
A more modern controversy happened with the failed 1998 confirmation by the state senate of popular sitting Attorney General Margery Bronster, as political payback for her actions to reform the corrupt Kamehameha Schools/Bishop Estate whose trustees were friends of various powerful legislators, many Hawaii residents called for the right to elect the attorney general.  Several attempts failed to create the constitutional amendment.

List of attorneys general
The attorneys general with dates of service:

Kingdom of Hawaii

Republic of Hawaii

Territory of Hawaii
 Henry Ernest Cooper, 1899–1900
 Edmund Pearson Dole, 1900–1903
 Lorrin Andrews, 1903–1905 (grandson of missionary Lorrin Andrews)
 Emil C. Peters, 1905–1907
 Charles R. Hemenway, 1907–1910
 Alexander Lindsay Jr., 1910–1912
 Wade Warren Thayer, 1913–1914
 Ingram M. Stainback, 1914–1918
 Arthur G. Smith, 1918
 Harry Irwin, 1918–1922
 John A. Matthewman, 1922–1925
 William B. Lymer, 1925–1928
 Harry P. Hewitt, 1928–1934
 William B. Pittman, 1934–1936
 S. B. Kemp, 1937–1938
 Joseph V. Hodgson, 1938–1942
 Ernest K. Kai, 1942
 J. Garner Anthony, 1942–1943
 Cyrus Nils Tavares, 1944–1947
 Walter D. Ackerman Jr., 1947–1952
 Michiro Watanabe, 1952–1953
 Edward N. Sylva, 1953–1956
 Richard K. Sharpless, 1956–1957
 Shiro Kashiwa, 1957
 Herbert Young Cho Choy, 1957–1958
 Jack H. Mizuha, 1958–1959

State of Hawaii
 Jack H. Mizuha, 1959
 Shiro Kashiwa, 1959–1960
Bert Kobayashi 1962–1969
Bertram Kanbara 1969–1971
 George T. H. Pai 1971
Ronald Amemiya, 1974–1978
Wayne Minami 1978–1981
Tany S. Hong, 1981–1984
Michael A. Lilly, 1984–1985
Corinne Watanabe 1985–1986
Warren Price, III 1986–1992
Robert A. Marks 1992–95
Margery Bronster, 1995–1998
Earl I. Anzai, 1999–2002
Mark J. Bennett, 2003–2010
David M. Louie, 2011–2014
Russell Suzuki , 2014–2015
Doug Chin, 2015–2018
Russell Suzuki, 2018–2019
Clare E. Connors, 2019–2021
Holly Shikada, 2021–2022
Anne E. Lopez, 2022–present

See also
Cabinet of the Kingdom of Hawaii

References

External links
 Hawaii Attorney General official website

 
1844 establishments in Hawaii